91.9 Sidharth FM, earlier known as Sarthak FM. Sidharth FM radio stations broadcast from Cuttack. This channel provides 24x7  odia songs music. This is the only station of the state who is playing odia tracks. The promoter of this group is Sitaram Agarwal & Namita Agarwal.
Enriched with a vast library of Odia Songs, the station was launched on 29 April 2017.

From 1 September 2021, 91.9 Sarthak FM has been renamed as 91.9 Sidharth FM. Post launch of three satellite television channels by Sidharthtv Network -  Sidharth TV (GEC), Sidharth Bhakti(Devotional) and Sidharth Gold (Movies & Music) in May 2021 they have incorporated all their business verticals under the brand of Sidharth.

The first independent song of 91.9 Sidharth FM is Niswasa To Bina Mora Chalena.

Broadcasting
Sidharth FM is broadcast from Cuttack stations in Odisha at 91.9 FM frequency.

Programmes

YouTube channels
YouTube channel of Sarthak FM for new odia songs is Sidharth Music.
For devotional songs - Sidharth Bhakti & Namita Agarwal.

See also
Namita Agarwal

References

2017 establishments in Odisha
Radio stations established in 2017
Radio stations in Odisha